Murray Aynsley Hill is a hillside suburb of Christchurch, New Zealand, located on the fringes of the Port Hills  south-east of the city centre. Situated above the suburb was Glenelg Children's Health Camp; the school for children with behavioural problems was closed by the Minister of Education, Anne Tolley, in January 2012. The suburb is named after early Christchurch settler Hugh Murray-Aynsley. The first owner of the land was Colonel Alexander Lean.

References

Suburbs of Christchurch